Bartosz Żurek (born 15 March 1993) is a Polish professional footballer who plays as a left winger for KSZO Ostrowiec Świętokrzyski.

Honours

Club
Legia Warsaw
Polish Cup: 2012–13

References 

1993 births
Living people
People from Sosnowiec
Polish footballers
Poland youth international footballers
Poland under-21 international footballers
Association football midfielders
Ekstraklasa players
I liga players
II liga players
III liga players
Legia Warsaw players
GKS Bełchatów players
Znicz Pruszków players
Elana Toruń players
MKS Cracovia (football) players
Puszcza Niepołomice players
KSZO Ostrowiec Świętokrzyski players
Sportspeople from Silesian Voivodeship